Events in the year 1764 in Norway.

Incumbents
Monarch: Frederick V

Events
 Porsgrunn prestegjeld (parish) was separated from the ancient rural parishes of Eidanger, Solum, and Gjerpen.
 The old city (original core) of Fredrikstad burns down.

Arts and literature

Births

3 March – Jens Stub, politician (died 1819)
5 April – Hans Jacob Grøgaard, priest and writer (died 1836).
22 August - Mathias Sommerhielm, politician (died 1827)
31 August – Johan August Sandels, soldier and politician (died 1831)
2 December - Peter Olivarius Bugge, bishop (died 1849)

Full date unknown
Anders Olson Lysne, leader of a farmer rebellion (died 1803)

Deaths

References

See also